Clifford Samuel Chapin IV (born January 29, 1988) is an American voice actor and director at Funimation and Bang Zoom! Entertainment.

Career 
Chapin is known for his roles in anime and video games, such as Ichijo Takayanagi from Red Data Girl, Connie Springer from Attack on Titan, Shingo Wakamoto from Prison School, Kukulkan in Smite, Hideyoshi Nagachika from Tokyo Ghoul, Yuri Dreyar from Fairy Tail,  and Katsuki Bakugo from My Hero Academia. Chapin won the VNs Now award Best Male VA of 2013 for his role of David Sawicki in Yousei by Sakevisual. He also worked as a production assistant for Toddlers and Tiaras, NBC Nightly News, Disaster Guy, and The Rolling Girls. In 2014, Chapin landed the lead voice role of Raishin Akabane in Unbreakable Machine-Doll. In 2015, he voiced the lead character Harutora Tsuchimikado in Tokyo Ravens.

Personal life
On June 18, 2021, Chapin was announced to be engaged to voice actress Kristen McGuire.

Filmography

Anime

Animation

Video games

Awards

References

External links 
 
 
 
 

1988 births
Living people
American male video game actors
American male voice actors
American voice directors
People from Griswold, Connecticut
Hofstra University alumni
21st-century American male actors